Ceratophyllus olsufjevi is a species of flea in the family Ceratophyllidae. It was described by Scalon and Violovich in 1961.

References 

Ceratophyllidae
Insects described in 1961